Matthew Charles Porretta (born May 29, 1965) is an American television-, voice-, and film-actor, known for his appearances in Wings, Beverly Hills, 90210, and Robin Hood: Men in Tights. He has also appeared on Broadway and in video games, where he is known for his roles as the titular character in Alan Wake and its sequel, Alan Wake II, plus as Dr. Darling in Control.

Life and career
Porretta was born in Darien, Connecticut, into a show-biz family: His father, Frank Porretta, was a famous opera-singer and musical-theater actor. His mother, Roberta, is also a trained singer and was Miss Ohio 1956.

By the age of 25, Porretta was already a veteran of Broadway and a student at the Manhattan School of Music. In 1990 Porretta broke into television with recurring roles on shows like Wings and Beverly Hills, 90210. In 1993 he was given his first major movie role, as Will Scarlet O'Hara in Mel Brooks' spoof Robin Hood: Men in Tights. Porretta starred as Robin Hood in his own TV series four years later. Since 1997 he has starred in many independent movies and been featured in commercials for McDonald's and Arrowhead Water. In 1994 he appeared in the original Broadway cast of Stephen Sondheim's Passion.

In 2010, Porretta portrayed the titular character of the psychological action thriller video game Alan Wake by Remedy Entertainment. He also portrayed Dr. Casper Darling in Remedy's Control.

Personal life
Porretta has four siblings. The eldest, Frank Porretta III, is a successful opera singer. His other brother, Greg, has guest-starred with Matthew on television. His sisters, Anna and Roberta, are also in the entertainment industry; Anna was a writer for Talk Soup.

Porretta has two sons with ex-wife Gleice; Luigi (born May 22, 2001) and Enzo (born April 13, 2008). The children were born while Porretta and Gleice were in a relationship. The couple eventually married in 2012 and divorced in 2014. Porretta is still living in Darien with his sons.

In December 2016, Porretta was involved in a bar fight in which an assailant hit Porretta with a beer mug causing severe injuries, scars on the left side of his face and partial loss of vision on his left eye. In March 2017, Porretta filed a lawsuit against the bar owner and alleged attacker. The lawsuit moved forward in June 2019, with the outcome still unknown.

Filmography
Alan Wake II (2023) .... Alan Wake (voice) (Pre-production)
Control (2019) .... Dr. Casper Darling (live acting and voice), Alan Wake (voice)
The Blacklist (2019) .... Schmock
Red Dead Online (2019) .... The Local Pedestrian Population
Quantum Break (2016) .... Alan Wake (voice)
Deadbeat .... Crosby / Matthew Biscotti (5 episodes, 2015)
The Bureau: XCOM Declassified (2013) .... Additional Voices
Grand Theft Auto V (2013) .... The Local Population
Alan Wake's American Nightmare (2012) .... Alan Wake, Mr. Scratch (voices)
Imagination Movers .... Stanley Spillburger  (episode "Seeing Stars", 2010)
Alan Wake (2010) .... Alan Wake (voice)
Bright Falls .... Alan Wake (episode "Clearcut," 2010)
CSI: NY .... Ron Bogda (episode "Hush", 2005)
Without a Trace .... Oscar (episode "Doppelgänger", 2004)
Dream Warrior (2003) .... Caleb
Code Name: Eternity .... Leethan (episode "Death Trap", 2000)
Kate's Addiction (1999) .... Dylan Parker
Turkey. Cake. (1999) .... Jimmy
Desperate But Not Serious (1999) .... Gene
The New Adventures of Robin Hood .... Robin Hood (23 episodes, 1996–1998)
Wings .... David Barnes (episode "Love at First Flight", 1996)
Dracula: Dead and Loving It (1995) .... Handsome Lieutenant at Ball
Beverly Hills, 90210 .... Dan Rubin (10 episodes, 1993)
Robin Hood: Men in Tights (1993) .... Will Scarlet O'Hara
South Beach .... Richard (episode "Wild Thing", 1993)
Class of '96 .... Claude (episode "Breaking up Is Hard to Overdue", 1993)

References

External links

1965 births
American male film actors
Living people
People from Darien, Connecticut
Male actors from Connecticut
American male video game actors
American male television actors
20th-century American male actors
21st-century American male actors